The Beijing Haidian Foreign Language Shi Yan School ( "Beijing Haidian Foreign Language Experimental School") or Haiwai (海外 Hǎiwài) in short is a private school in Haidian District, Beijing, China. The school teaches elementary, secondary, and senior high school.

In 1999 the school was founded. It established the Beijing Haidian International School.

In 2011 the school and Lake Shore Public Schools of Metro Detroit, United States signed an agreement to work solely with each other lasting 21 years. The private school sends senior high school students on exchanges to the United States, where they live in a special dormitory established by Lake Shore Schools.

In 2014, the school and Paramus Catholic High School (PC) had established sister school relationship, and launched a new program by sending students to 9th grade for one full school year.

Notable alumni
 Lu Han

References

External links

 Beijing Haidian Foreign Language Shi Yan School

High schools in Beijing
Schools in Beijing
1999 establishments in China
Educational institutions established in 1999
Schools in Haidian District